Sir Kenneth George Luke  (11 November 1896 – 13 June 1971) was a self-made millionaire manufacturer and a leading Australian rules football administrator in the Victorian Football League (VFL). He was president of the VFL between 1956 and 1971 and president of the Carlton Football Club from 1938 to 1955.

Luke was a member of the Carlton Football Club committee from 1935 to 1937 and Carlton President from 1938 to 1955. He also served as VFL Vice-President 1946 to 1955 and VFL President 1956 to 1971. Along with Eric McCutchan he played a major role in the purchase of land for Waverley Park in 1962 and the development of the stadium, and its main grandstand was named in his honour.

Sir Kenneth was inducted to the Australian Football Hall of Fame in 1996.

References

1896 births
1971 deaths
20th-century Australian businesspeople
Australian Football Hall of Fame inductees
Australian Companions of the Order of St Michael and St George
Australian Knights Bachelor
Carlton Football Club administrators
People educated at Ballarat High School
Sport Australia Hall of Fame inductees
VFL/AFL administrators